Thomas William Higginson, MBE (born 6 November 1936 in Esher, Surrey) is an English former first-class cricketer. 

Known as Bill, he represented Middlesex in three first-class matches and once for L. C. Stevens XI in 1960.

He later served as a scorer and umpire. In later years, he was subsequently awarded the MBE for his community service.

References

1936 births
English cricketers
Middlesex cricketers
Living people
L. C. Stevens' XI cricketers